Erik Bue Pedersen (born January 22, 1952) is a former Danish handball player who competed in the 1980 Summer Olympics.

He was born in Lystrup.

In 1980 he finished ninth with the Danish team in the Olympic tournament. He played five matches and scored five goals.

External links
 profile

1952 births
Living people
Danish male handball players
Olympic handball players of Denmark
Handball players at the 1980 Summer Olympics